Newport Guildhall is a large timber-framed municipal building in Newport, Shropshire, England. It is a Grade II* listed building.

History
The current building replaced an earlier guildhall on the site which is mentioned in a document dated 1252. The southern part of the current building was constructed as a single room, with gable to the road, possibly as a meeting place for the Guild of Newport, in around 1400. The building was built in a typical medieval style with exposed timbers and brick infilling which has been painted white. An intermediate floor was added to the original hall at a later date. Testing of the beams in the roof using  dendrochronology suggests that the current roof was added in 1486.

The northern part of the building was constructed in a similar architectural style in the late 16th century. The internal beams on the ground floor in this part of the building were decorated with chevrons, antlers, acanthus leaves and pomegranates with the last of these being associated with Catherine of Aragon. The two buildings were unified externally as a single building with a continuous roof-line in the early 19th century. A beam visible on the front elevation of the building, with the name "Wm Gregari" and dated 1615, was not a feature of the original building and was probably taken from a local public house and inserted to add an additional air of authenticity in the late 19th century.

The building was used as a meeting place by Newport Urban District Council but ceased to be the local seat of government when The Wrekin District Council was formed in 1974. On 13 June 1991, the building was acquired by the Boughey Trust, a trust corporation established by Lady Boughey in memory of her late husband, Sir Thomas Fletcher Fenton Boughey, 4th Baronet who died on 30 August 1906. The Boughey Trust made the guildhall available, rent-free, to Newport Town Council who restored it with the support of English Heritage and it was officially re-opened to the public by Algernon Heber-Percy, Vice-Lord Lieutenant of Shropshire, on 25 March 1995. In spring 2019 improvement works were carried out involving a new boiler and new carpets, paintwork and lighting.

The ground floor of the southern section of the building is used as a council information centre while the ground floor of the northern section is used as a tea room. Meetings of the Town Council are normally held in the council chamber on the first floor of the building. The council chamber is also used for weddings and civic ceremonies.

See also
 Grade II* listed buildings in Telford and Wrekin

References

Grade II* listed buildings in Shropshire
City and town halls in Shropshire
Buildings and structures in Newport, Shropshire
Timber framed buildings in England
Government buildings completed in 1400